Konokovo is the name of several rural localities in Russia:
Konokovo, Krasnodar Krai, a selo in Konokovsky Rural Okrug of Uspensky District of Krasnodar Krai
Konokovo, Tver Oblast, a village in Velikooktyabrskoye Rural Settlement of Firovsky District of Tver Oblast